The Spreading Dawn is a 1917 American silent drama film produced by Samuel Goldwyn in his first year of producing independently in his own studio and starring Broadway stage star Jane Cowl in her second and final silent film. It was directed by Laurence Trimble. The film is lost with a fragment, apparently only part of reel 3, surviving at the Library of Congress.

This film was based on a short fiction The Spreading Dawn by Basil King that first appeared in the Saturday Evening Post. It was later the title of a collection of short stories in 1927.

Plot
As described in a film magazine, Georgina Vanderpyl (Ballin) loves Captain Lewis Nugent (Lowe), but her aunt Patricia (Cowl) will not allow her to marry, and as proof of her reasons she gives Georgina her journal to read. The story as told in the journal is how happy Patricia is when she meets Anthony Vanderpyl (Caldara). They are married, but shortly thereafter Anthony is called away to war. He comes home on a furlough and after a brief visit leaves. Patricia does not understand this sudden departure, and then Mr. LeRoy (Stephenson) tells her that Anthony is with his wife Cornelia (Billings). When Anthony returns, LeRoy shoots Anthony and Patricia believes the worst of him. Dying, Anthony writes a letter to his wife, but Patricia has never opened it. Georgina coaxes her to read it, and when Patricia does, she discovers her late husband's innocence. Asking his forgiveness, she goes to meet him in the spreading dawn.

Cast

References

External links

Lantern slide featuring Jane Cowl and Orme Caldara likenesses (WaybackMachine)

1917 films
American silent feature films
Films based on short fiction
Films directed by Laurence Trimble
1917 drama films
Silent American drama films
American Civil War films
American black-and-white films
Lost American films
1917 lost films
Lost drama films
1910s American films
Goldwyn Pictures films
1910s English-language films